Estadio Santa Bárbara is a Spanish rugby union and football stadium. It is located in Llaranes, at south-east of Avilés (Asturias).

It was built for the sports use by the ENSIDESA employees in 1958 and was the home stadium of Club Deportivo Ensidesa, as Estadio Juan Muro de Zaro, named after an ENSIDESA economist who was the only chairman of the club. Between 1990 and 1999 it was also the playing field of Real Avilés Club de Fútbol.

References 
 

Rugby union stadiums in Spain
Sport in Avilés
Multi-purpose stadiums in Spain
Football venues in Spain
Sports venues in Asturias
Sports venues completed in 1958